Nahnatchka Khan (born June 17, 1973) is an American television writer and producer. She created and executive produced the ABC comedy series Don't Trust the B---- in Apartment 23 (2012–2013) and Fresh Off the Boat (2015–2020), and the NBC comedy series Young Rock (2021– ). She also directed the 2019 Netflix film Always Be My Maybe.

Early life
Khan's parents immigrated to the United States from Iran. She was born in Las Vegas and grew up in Hawaii. She attended the University of Southern California's School of Cinematic Arts. While in college, she interned at National Lampoon and Fox.

Career 
Khan started her writing career on 20th Century Fox's Malcolm in the Middle. She also worked for Disney Television Animation, including Disney's 1990s animated sitcom, Pepper Ann, the division's first series created by a woman. According to Khan, Pepper Ann's "Sue Rose wanted to do this show about this 12-year-old girl raised by a single mom and who had this really active fantasy life," something that had not been done before. Khan also worked on American Dad! and on the children's series Unfabulous.

In 2012, Khan created the ABC comedy series Don't Trust the B---- in Apartment 23. The series debuted on April 11, 2012, and ran for two seasons until January 15, 2013.

In 2015, Khan created the TV show Fresh Off the Boat which also aired on ABC. The show was lauded for being "the first network sitcom to feature an Asian family since 1994's All-American Girl." Khan was honored for her contributions to the Asian Pacific American community, specifically through this show, by East West Players during their 50th Anniversary Visionary Awards Dinner & Silent Auction. The series ran for six seasons and concluded on February 21, 2020.

In 2016, Khan signed a multiyear deal to create, write, develop, and supervise projects for Twentieth Century Fox, under her company, Fierce Baby Productions. As of 2013, she had a television pilot in development titled Fatrick, slated to star Zach Cregger, with Fox.

In 2018, it was announced that Khan would make her directorial debut with Always Be My Maybe which was released on Netflix in May 2019. The film went on to be positively received. On Rotten Tomatoes the film has an approval rating of 89% based on 94 reviews, with an average rating of 7.00/10. The site's critical consensus reads, "Carried by the infectious charms of Ali Wong and Randall Park, Always Be My Maybe takes familiar rom-com beats and cleverly layers in smart social commentary to find its own sweet groove."

Then in 2021, she co-created the series Young Rock with Jeff Chiang which premiered on NBC on February 16, 2021. The series has received generally positive reviews from critics. In April 2021, the series was renewed for a second season.

Themes
As an Iranian-American, Khan remembered growing up with few representations of herself on television. "There was really no representation of any Middle Eastern culture, so [for me and my brother] growing up, our hero was Iron Sheik—a character in WWF wrestling…. He was from Iran, and he was always the underdog to, like, Hulk Hogan. Everybody was booing, but we were super cheering for him!" Like many women in the television industry, Khan reported feeling "pigeon-holed" as a writer. "I was the only woman in the room a lot of times, so I felt like people looked at me for the wife joke or the daughter joke," she said. "For me it was just the female voice."

From the beginning of her career, Khan has created diverse images that work to subvert television stereotypes. She is best known for creating the ABC sitcoms Don't Trust the B---- in Apartment 23 and Fresh Off the Boat. Fresh Off the Boat, based on restaurateur Eddie Huang's memoir, made television history by centering the experiences of a Taiwanese-American family in Florida. One critic commented on its additional significance that, "It was the first show to feature an Asian American cast since All American Girl in 1994. In at least one show, Asian-Americans would not be desexualized, hypersexualized, caricatured or stereotyped."

A lesbian herself, Khan routinely features queer themes in Fresh Off the Boat: Eddie's mom, Jessica (Constance Wu), regularly visits the local lesbian bar, The Denim Turtle. Eddie's former love interest, Nicole, struggles to come out to her father and family.

Personal life
Khan's brother, Nick Khan, is the President and co-CEO of WWE.

Filmography

Film 
 Always Be My Maybe (Director, 2019)
 Totally Killer (Director, 2023)

Television

References

External links 

American television producers
American women television producers
American television writers
Living people
American women television writers
Place of birth missing (living people)
American lesbian writers
American LGBT screenwriters
LGBT producers
LGBT film directors
USC School of Cinematic Arts alumni
LGBT people from Hawaii
LGBT people from Nevada
American writers of Iranian descent
Showrunners
1973 births
21st-century American women writers